Miguel Alejandro de Lara Ojeda (born 9 August 1994) is a Mexican swimmer. He competed in the men's 50 metre breaststroke event at the 2017 World Aquatics Championships.

References

External links
 

1994 births
Living people
Sportspeople from Torreón
Mexican male swimmers
Mexican male breaststroke swimmers
Swimmers at the 2015 Pan American Games
Swimmers at the 2019 Pan American Games
Pan American Games medalists in swimming
Pan American Games bronze medalists for Mexico
Medalists at the 2019 Pan American Games
Central American and Caribbean Games medalists in swimming
Central American and Caribbean Games gold medalists for Mexico
Central American and Caribbean Games silver medalists for Mexico
Central American and Caribbean Games bronze medalists for Mexico
Competitors at the 2014 Central American and Caribbean Games
Competitors at the 2018 Central American and Caribbean Games
21st-century Mexican people